,  stage name of Akio Kato (加藤晃夫), was a Japanese actor.

He starred in Season of the Sun, Endless Desire, My Second Brother, Stolen Desire, and Sukeban Deka, and Yo-Yo Girl Cop.

Life and career
Nagato was born in Kyoto City and came from an illustrious film family. His younger brother Masahiko Tsugawa is an actor. His wife Yōko Minamida was an actress. His grandfather is the director Shōzō Makino, nicknamed the Father of Japanese Film; his father, Kunitarō Sawamura, and his mother, Tomoko Makino, were both actors. His aunt and uncle through his father are the actors Sadako Sawamura and Daisuke Katō. His niece was the actress Mayuko and she referred to him as "Achi" (Uncle Akio).  Masayuki Makino, his cousin from his mother's side, was the first principal of the Okinawa Actors School. He had no children with his wife Yoko. He is distantly related to the modern Japanese comedian Daisuke Miyagawa.

After graduating from Hanazono High School, Nagato entered into Ritsumeikan University's Depart of Literature but dropped out. Former Hanshin Tigers coach Yoshio Yoshida attended Ritsumeikan at the same time as Nagato but also dropped out.

Acting career
His first movie appearance was in the 1940 film Zokushi Mizuminato (續清水港). He was a widely known child actor before World War II. During his school years he took a temporary break from acting but after the war he joined the entertainment company Nikkatsu where he resumed film-making. He starred in the first installment book-turned-movie Taiyouzoku series, Season of the Sun, with his co-star, Yujiro Ishihara who debuted with this movie. Combined with director Shohei Imamura, the movie left him with the reputation of having acting and gave him the nickname of "Nikkatsu's Billboard Star".

In 1961 Nagato married Yoko Minamida and the following year he left Nikkatsu. In 1964, together with his wife, he established the film company Ningen Production. In 1968 he produced and starred in the television drama Katsudoya Ichiyo on MBS. However, due to compounding issues with the series, it plunged him 200 million yen into debt.

From 1982 he also became known as a personality appearing on the KBS Kyoto's charity radio show Great Snail War. The show provided help and raise money for  children who were orphaned because of accidents.  His wife also participated alongside him starting from 1984. He and his wife continued appearing until the campaign's end in 2005.

He also worked together alongside other celebrities born in the same year as him (1934): Yujiro Ishihara, Kinya Aikawa, Koizumi Ohashi, Ichiro Zaitsu, Jiro Sakagami, Shunji Fujimura, Gorō Mutsumi, Shuichiro Moriyama to form the friendship association Showa 9 Nenkai (昭和9年会). The 9th year of the Showa era is the equivalent of 1934.

To Yoko Controversy
In November 1985, Nagato published an exposé called To Yoko(洋子へ); it was published by the publisher Datahouse.(データハウス) . It was a series of confessions to his wife, in which he wrote about his numerous infidelities without changing any names of those he had affairs with. It astounded the Japanese media. Junko Ikeuchi, who was among the people included in the book under her real name, voiced a strong objection in response.

Nagato and Datahouse recalled the first edition and issued a revised version  in which the problem areas were re-written. Nagato also took out an ad in the Ikeuchi newspaper to apologize over the situation. Nagato argued that, "Because [I] used a ghostwriter, my true intentions were not conveyed." However the entire incident seriously damaged his and his wife's careers. They were forced to resign from all the programs and commercials they had currently appeared in. He went on numerous different celebrity gossip shows for interviews about the event and repeatedly slammed his book against the desk while disparaging it.

After a long time Nagato recovered from the incident and even went back to thriving, performing mainly antagonist or villain roles in television dramas.

Last Years
In his last years, Nagato devoted himself to making amends with his wife for all his affairs (and the scandal caused by the book) and became her caregiver when she was diagnosed with dementia. At the same time, he also increasingly started co-starring more with his younger brother Tsugawa, who he had been feuding with for many years. He also appeared in works directed by Tsugawa who assumed the name of Makino Masahiko.

On 21 October 2009, Yoko Minamida, died of subarachnoid hemorrhage (SAH) at the age of 76. At a press conference held at the Meiji Theater the day Minamida died, Nagato stated, with tears in his eyes, "From now on, I will step into a world without my wife. Yoko lives on in my memories. This is what eternity means. [...] These four years of caring for her has been my rebirth and has changed my outlook on life."

Death
After his wife's death, Nagato continued working until right before his own final days. On 21 May 2011, one year and seven months after the death of his wife, Nagato passed away at Juntendo Clinic in Tokyo at 5:20pm.  He was 77. That night, Tsukawa stated that his brother's condition was "A complication caused by pneumonia, but he was fine the day before", and revealed that his condition had changed suddenly the day of his death. Tsugawa along with Nagato's private friend of 60 years Ruriko Asaoka,  rushed to respond to the press media's coverage.Upon receiving Nagato's obituary, Enzo Tachibana, who had been close to Nagato for many years and a member of the Showa 9 Nenkai, announced his condolences saying, "(With the death of Hiroshi Tamaki and Sakagami) more and more friends are now gone." Others who had a friendly relationship with Nagato commended their own condolences. Aimi Higa, who co-starred with him in DonDon Hare, wrote a comment on her blog in memory of Nagato. Toshiyuki Nishida, who co-starred with him in Ikenaka Genta 80 Kg, said that the titular character "weeps" for his death. Kinichi Hagimoto, who was long loved by  Nagato and his wife like a younger brother, when paying his own condolences and choked up with grief said, "He was the ultimate mentor, friend, and brother."

The wake and funeral service were held on 24 May at Zenpukuji in Minato-ku, Tokyo, with Tsugawa serving as the funeral officiant. The body was then cremated at the Kirigaya Yasaijyou in Shinagawa-ku, Tokyo. Kiichi Nakai and Takashi Sasano read the condolences at wake while Tetsuko Kuroyagi and Eiji Okuda read the condolences at the funeral and memorial ceremony. Nagato was given the posthumous name, traditional in Buddhist funeral ceremonies, of "Gokugeiin Shijojoaki"(極芸院釋浄晃).

Nagato's last movie appearance was in Aoi Aoi Sora (青い青い空) released on 9 October 2010. His last TV drama appearance was on the last episode of the NHK Saturday drama Onmitu Happyaku Yacho (隠密八百八町) broadcast on 26 March 2011, about two months before his death.

Filmography

Films

Television

External links 
 
 

1934 births
2011 deaths
Male actors from Kyoto
Ritsumeikan University alumni